The following list includes notable people who were born or have lived in the U.S. city of St. Albans, Vermont.

Artists and authors 

 Arthur Scott Bailey, children's author
 Paul Blackburn, poet
 Ezra Brainerd, college professor
 Abbott Lowell Cummings, architectural historian and genealogist
 Winston Freer, magician
 Frances Frost, poet
 Chantal Joffe, artist
 Rod Loomis, actor
 Dan Parent, comic book writer and artist
 Ann Eliza Smith, writer
 Lucy Langdon Wilson, educator and ethnographer

Business 

 Louis Sherry, restaurateur and hotelier
 George J. Stannard, farmer, foundry operator and major general
 William Shepard Wetmore, merchant

Military 

 William Beaumont, US Army physician
 Edward J. O'Neill, US Army lieutenant general
 William Farrar Smith, Union Army engineer and major general
 Lee Stephen Tillotson, Adjutant General of the Vermont National Guard
 William Tilton (1834–1910), born in St. Albans, Medal of Honor recipient in the American Civil War

Outlaws 

 Richard M. Brewer, cowboy and outlaw
 Sile Doty, robber and horse thief

Politicians 

 Asa Aldis, Chief Justice of the Vermont Supreme Court
 Asa O. Aldis, Associate Justice of the Vermont Supreme Court
 Warren Austin, US senator and ambassador
 Bradley Barlow, US congressman
 Herman R. Beardsley, Justice of the Vermont Supreme Court
 Jeptha Bradley, Vermont Auditor of Accounts
 Lawrence Brainerd, businessman, abolitionist and US senator
 Elbert S. Brigham, US congressman
 Josiah Sandford Brigham, physician and Canadian politician
 Stephen S. Cushing, Associate Justice of the Vermont Supreme Court
 Frank L. Greene, US congressman and senator
 Edward Chester Plow, soldier and the 22nd Lieutenant Governor of Nova Scotia
 Percival L. Shangraw, Chief Justice of the Vermont Supreme Court
 J. Gregory Smith, 28th governor of Vermont
 John Smith, US congressman
 Worthington Curtis Smith, US congressman
 Hiram F. Stevens, lawyer, state senator and congressman from Minnesota
 William Strong, judge
 Benjamin Swift, US congressman and senator
 Harold C. Sylvester, Saint Albans City Attorney, Alderman, and member of the Vermont House of Representatives; Judge of the Vermont Superior Court and Associate Justice of the Vermont Supreme Court
 Jeff Weaver, political adviser and campaign manager for Bernie Sanders; 1987 alderman candidate and 1990 mayoral candidate
 Solomon Lewis Withey, federal judge

Sports 

 John LeClair, left winger for the Montreal Canadiens, Philadelphia Flyers, and Pittsburgh Penguins

References

St. Albans, Vermont
St. Albans